Moiso is an Espiritu Santo language of Vanuatu. It is spoken in Moriuli village in central Santo Island by about 100 people (Tryon 2010).

References

Sources

Tryon, Darrell. 2010. The languages of Espiritu Santo, Vanuatu. In John Bowden and Nikolaus P. Himmelmann and Malcolm Ross (eds.), A journey through Austronesian and Papuan linguistic and cultural space: papers in honour of Andrew K. Pawley, 283-290. Canberra: Research School of Pacific and Asian Studies, Australian National University.

Malekula languages
Languages of Vanuatu